Primary cremation  and secondary cremation are terms in archaeology for describing burials of  cremated bodies.

Primary cremation refers to burials where the body is burned "on the spot", in the grave. A secondary cremation is the burning of the body in one spot and then burying the remains and grave goods elsewhere. Secondary cremation may also more specifically refer to a cremation where the body is burned on a pyre, after which the bones are collected from the ashes and buried elsewhere (Sprague 2005:138). A famous account of such a burial is that of Homer's Iliad, describing the funeral of Patroclus.

References
 Roderick Sprague, Burial terminology: a guide for researchers, Rowman Altamira, 2005, .

Archaeology of death
Death customs
Cremation